Nivaldo Batista Santana (born 23 June 1980), known simply as Nivaldo, is a Brazilian professional footballer who plays as a central defender for Lagarto Futebol Clube.

Football career
Born in Feira de Santana, Bahia, Nivaldo started playing with modest Brazilian clubs – he did represent Coritiba Foot Ball Club on two occasions, but appeared rarely – and moved to Portugal with C.F. Os Belenenses in 2007, being an undisputed starter as the Lisbon team finished fifth and qualified for the UEFA Cup, with the defender scoring four goals, partnering future FC Porto and Portugal star Rolando in the heart of the back four; on 28 February 2007, he also helped them come from behind against lowly GD Bragança and reach the semi-finals of the Taça de Portugal following a 2–1 away win.

Nivaldo joined AS Saint-Étienne for a price of €3 million in summer 2007, but featured sparingly in his debut season. The following year he was loaned to Qatari side Umm-Salal Sports Club, allegedly against his will.

After being released in June 2009, Nivaldo joined Spanish club Real Valladolid on a one-year contract. He made his La Liga debut on 30 August in a 0–0 draw at UD Almería, being sent off in the 13th minute; he also received his marching orders when he scored his first goal on 4 October, helping the hosts draw 2–2 against Athletic Bilbao.

In June 2010, after Valladolid's relegation, Nivaldo changed teams and countries again, signing a two-year contract with Maccabi Tel Aviv F.C. of Israel on a free transfer. On 1 August he netted his first goal, in a Toto Cup win against Maccabi Netanya FC; thirteen days later, however, he was sidelined for two months due to a knee injury, which forced the club to sign Savo Pavićević as a cover.

Honours
Náutico
Campeonato Pernambucano: 2002

Coritiba
Campeonato Paranaense: 2004

Ashdod
Liga Leumit: 2015–16

References

External links

CBF data 

1980 births
Living people
Brazilian footballers
Association football defenders
Campeonato Brasileiro Série A players
Campeonato Brasileiro Série B players
Clube Náutico Capibaribe players
Coritiba Foot Ball Club players
Fortaleza Esporte Clube players
Paulista Futebol Clube players
Primeira Liga players
C.F. Os Belenenses players
Rio Ave F.C. players
Ligue 1 players
AS Saint-Étienne players
Qatar Stars League players
Umm Salal SC players
La Liga players
Real Valladolid players
Israeli Premier League players
Liga Leumit players
Maccabi Tel Aviv F.C. players
Maccabi Yavne F.C. players
F.C. Ashdod players
Hapoel Katamon Jerusalem F.C. players
Lagarto Futebol Clube players
Brazilian expatriate footballers
Expatriate footballers in Portugal
Expatriate footballers in France
Expatriate footballers in Qatar
Expatriate footballers in Spain
Expatriate footballers in Israel
Brazilian expatriate sportspeople in Portugal
Brazilian expatriate sportspeople in France
Brazilian expatriate sportspeople in Qatar
Brazilian expatriate sportspeople in Spain
Brazilian expatriate sportspeople in Israel